Atari Logo is ROM cartridge-based version of the Logo programming language  for the Atari 8-bit family published by Atari, Inc. in 1983. It was developed by Logo Computer Systems, Inc. (LCSI) in Quebec, Canada. LCSI wrote Apple Logo, and the Atari version maintains strong compatibility with it.

Atari Logo includes commands that support Atari 8-bit enhanced graphics: 4 simultaneous drawing turtles that look like actual turtles instead of triangles, a built-in editor for redefining turtle shapes, and an event handler for collision detection. The TOOT primitive plays a tone on one of two 16-bit audio channels given a frequency, volume, and duration. Atari Logo shipped with a 216-page manual and a 16-page Quick Reference Guide.

Reception
Scott Mace of InfoWorld wrote, "Atari Logo is an excellent product and it enhances the value of Atari computers for learning in the classroom and in the home. It wins the battle with BASIC hands down."

In a 1983 review for ANALOG Computing, Brian Moriarty concluded, "Atari Logo is one of the most intelligently-conceived and well-executed pieces of software ever published by ATARI."

References

External links
Atari Logo at Atari Mania
Computer Art and Animation: A User's Guide to Atari Logo 1984 book by David Thornburg

1983 software
Atari 8-bit family software
Logo programming language family